Cyllonium is a genus of extinct insects. It contains two species.

Discovery
Both species of Cyllonium were first described by the English entomologist John Obadiah Westwood. The fossils were recovered from the Early Cretaceous (Berriasian age) of the Lower Purbeck formation, Durdlestone Bay, England.

Taxonomy
Very little is known of the two fossils as they were published without description. Illustrations, however, were provided, but even these show that the fossils were fragmentary. They were originally identified to be butterflies, but this is now generally not accepted.

They have been tentatively identified as possible palaeontinids (extinct giant cicadas) in 1961.

Species
The two species assigned to the genus are the following:
Cyllonium boidusvalianum Westwood, 1854
Cyllonium hewitsonianum Westwood, 1854

See also
Cicadomorpha
Prehistoric insects
Prehistoric Lepidoptera

References

Early Cretaceous insects
Prehistoric insects of Europe
Extinct Hemiptera